The Funny Side is an American sketch comedy program that aired on NBC as part of its 1971 fall lineup.

Synopsis
The Funny Side was hosted by Gene Kelly and starred five pairs of actors and actresses who were presented as married couples. Each week was an examination of the "funny side" of a potential issue in real-life marriages, such as health, money, sex, and the like.  Each couple was a stereotype.  Kelly also appeared as an actor in the sketches, and there was also a musical aspect with production numbers.

Cast
 John Amos and Teresa Graves as the Black couple
 Warren Berlinger and Pat Finley as the blue collar couple
 Dick Clair and Jenna McMahon as the wealthy couple
 Michael Lembeck and Cindy Williams as the teenage couple
 Burt Mustin and Queenie Smith as the elderly couple

Cancellation
The Funny Side received poor Nielsen ratings and was cancelled after less than four months on the air.

References

 Brooks, Tim and Marsh, Earle, The Complete Directory to Prime Time Network and Cable TV Shows

External links 
 

NBC original programming
1970s American musical comedy television series
1970s American sketch comedy television series
1971 American television series debuts
1972 American television series endings